The 2011–12 FA Cup qualifying rounds opened the 131st season of competition in England for 'The Football Association Challenge Cup' (FA Cup), the world's oldest association football single knockout competition. A new record 763 clubs were accepted for the competition, up four from the previous season's 759.

The large number of clubs entering the tournament from lower down (Levels 5 through 10) in the English football pyramid meant that the competition started with six rounds of preliminary (2) and qualifying (4) knockouts for these non-League teams. The 32 winning teams from the fourth qualifying round progressed to the First round proper, where League teams tiered at Levels 3 and 4 entered the competition.

Calendar and prizes
The calendar for the 2011–12 FA Cup qualifying rounds, as announced by the FA.

Extra preliminary round
Extra preliminary round ties were played on the weekend of 20 August 2011. 408 clubs from Level 9 and Level 10 of English football, entered at this stage of the competition.

Preliminary round
Preliminary round fixtures were played on the weekend of 3 September 2011. A total of 334 clubs took part in this stage of the competition, including the 204 winners from the Extra preliminary round and 130 entering at this stage from the six leagues at Level 8 of English football, while Ilkeston and Farsley from Northern Premier League were ineligible to participate as they only spent their second seasons. The round featured 48 clubs from Level 10 still in the competition, being the lowest ranked teams in this round.

First qualifying round
The First qualifying round fixtures were played on the weekend of 17 September 2011, with replays being played the following mid-week. A total of 232 clubs took part in this stage of the competition, including the 167 winners from the preliminary round and 65 entering at this stage from the top division of the three leagues at Level 7 of English football, while Chester from Northern Premier League were ineligible to participate as they only spent their second season. The round featured sixteen clubs from Level 10 still in the competition, being the lowest ranked clubs in this round.

Second qualifying round
The Second qualifying round fixtures were played on the weekend of 1 October 2011. A total of 160 clubs took part in this stage of the competition, including the 116 winners from the first qualifying round and 44 Level 6 clubs, from Conference North and Conference South, entering at this stage. Six clubs from Level 10 of English football, was the lowest-ranked team to qualify for this round of the competition.

Third qualifying round
The Third qualifying round took place on the weekend of 15 October 2011. A total of 80 clubs took part, all having progressed from the second qualifying round. Four clubs from Level 10 of English football were the lowest-ranked teams to qualify for this round of the competition.

Fourth qualifying round
The Fourth qualifying round took place on the weekend of 29 October 2011. A total of 64 clubs took part, 40 having progressed from the third qualifying round and 24 clubs from Conference Premier, forming Level 5 of English football, entering at this stage. The lowest-ranked side to qualify for this round was Level 10 club Hebburn Town.

Competition proper

Winners from the fourth qualifying round advance to first round Proper, where clubs from Level 3 and Level 4 of English football, operating in The Football League, first enter the competition. See 2011–12 FA Cup for a report of First round proper onwards.

References

External links
 The FA Cup Archive

Qualifying
FA Cup qualifying rounds